Colin Angus may refer to:

 Colin Angus (explorer), Canadian explorer
 Colin Angus (musician), member of the British electronic music group The Shamen